Rangsit is a city and neighbourhood in Pathum Thani Province, Thailand. Rangsit is a metropolitan city that supports the expansion of Bangkok in the north. Rangsit has become a departure point for travel to provinces in north, northeast, and eastern Thailand.

Rangsit is the home of Rangsit University

The area is served by Rangsit station on the SRT's northern line and dark red line.

History
In the past, the area of Rangsit was a vast field, covering the area from the north of Bangkok, Pathum Thani to Saraburi and the east side of the Chao Phraya River was called "Thung Luang" (ทุ่งหลวง, refers to large field), with an area of approximately 2,000 km² (about 772 mi²). 

At that time, it was a place of habitat for many kinds of wildlife, such as wild elephants, therefore called "Tha Khlong" (ท่าโขลง, refers to pier of herd of elephants) in another name. There are often wild elephants from Khao Yai often living. In addition, it was also the only habitat in the world of Schomburgk's deer (Rucervus schomburgki) an extinct medium-sized deer. 

Until the reign of King Chulalongkorn (Rama V) in middle Rattanakosin period, Thailand's first irrigation canal was canalized and passed through this area, it was called "Khlong Rangsit" in honour to his son, Prince Rangsit Prayurasakdi, Prince of Chainat,   causing Rangsit to become an agricultural area especially rice cultivation, including various kinds of fruits such as tangerine and make the area of Rangsit continue to prosper respectively.

References

External links

Populated places in Pathum Thani province

Neighbourhoods in Thailand